Fried pork is pork which is fried.

List of fried pork dishes
 Stegt flæsk, fried pork belly from Denmark that is generally served with potatoes and a parsley sauce (persillesovs)
 Griot, a Haitian staple dish consisting of pork shoulder which is marinated in citrus, braised, and deep-fried
 Tonkatsu, a Japanese food which consists of a breaded, deep-fried pork cutlet
 Kotlet schabowy, a Polish pork cutlet